Carriker is a surname. Notable people with the surname include:

Adam Carriker (born 1984), American football player
Levvy Carriker (born 1959), Film producer, TV director, magazine publisher, Director of Development at Allied Artists 
Max Carriker (1921–1979), American politician
Melbourne Armstrong Carriker (1879–1965), American ornithologist and entomologist